Samlah was a king of Edom mentioned in the Hebrew Bible, in Genesis 36:31-43. He succeeded Hadad ben Bedad in the apparently elective kingship of the early Edomites. He is described as being from Masrekah. He was succeeded by Saul of Rehoboth. 

The date of his reign is unknown.

Kings of Edom
Book of Genesis people